Calliteara farenoides is a species of moth of the family Erebidae. It is found in Queensland.

The wingspan is about 40 mm for males and 60 mm for females. Females are white with a few brown lines on the forewings, while males have more pronounced lines and orange hindwings.

The larvae feed on Terminalia carolinensis. The larvae are dimorphic. There is a yellow form with an orange head which is covered with long yellow hairs. There is also a reddish form.

Taxonomy
Calliteara farenoides is sometimes treated a subspecies of Calliteara horsfieldii.

References

Lymantriinae
Moths described in 1892
Moths of Australia